Patrick Flynn (born 16 August 1968) is an Australian former professional tennis player. He is now a children's novelist.

Flynn was a junior singles finalist at the 1984 Australian Open, losing to Mark Kratzmann. He played college tennis for the University of Texas at Austin for four years and while competing on the professional tour had a best singles ranking of 390 in the world. In 1988 he won the Queensland Hardcourt Championships.

References

External links
 
 

1968 births
Living people
Australian male tennis players
Texas Longhorns men's tennis players
Tennis people from Queensland
20th-century Australian people